The Das Garças River is a river of Mato Grosso state in western Brazil. It is also close to river Madeira.

See also
List of rivers of Mato Grosso

References

Rivers of Mato Grosso